Rosemary Jill Signal (born 4 May 1962) is a New Zealand former  cricketer who played as an all-rounder, batting right-handed and bowling right-arm medium. She appeared in 1 Test match and 6 One Day Internationals for New Zealand in 1984 and 1985. She played domestic cricket for Central Districts. 

Her twin sister Liz also played cricket for New Zealand. They were the first twins to play test cricket together.

References

External links

1962 births
Living people
People from Feilding
New Zealand women cricketers
New Zealand women Test cricketers
New Zealand women One Day International cricketers
Central Districts Hinds cricketers
New Zealand twins
Twin sportspeople